Catherine Breen (born 1965) is an American Democratic politician from Maine. Breen, a Falmouth resident, is currently serving her fourth term representing Senate District 25, which includes the towns of Falmouth, Cumberland, Yarmouth, Gray, Long Island, Chebeague Island and part of Westbrook.

Early life and education
Breen earned a Bachelor of Arts in history and political science from Tufts University and a Master of Education from the University of Illinois at Chicago. She has worked as a middle school teacher and has lived in the greater Portland, Maine area since 2000.

Breen has served on the Board of Directors of Community Counseling Center and has served on the Spurwink Board of Directors since 2013. She is also a graduate of the Institute for Civic Leadership’s collaborative leadership training program.

Political career
Breen was the Falmouth representative to the Greater Portland Council of Governments, a group of town leaders from 30 municipalities in the Portland area, for six years. She served on the Falmouth Town Council from 2005 until she termed out in 2011, including two years as chairwoman.

Maine State Senate
In 2014, Breen ran for the seat being vacated by independent Richard Woodbury, who did not seek re-election. In the general election, Breen was declared the narrow winner on election night. Her opponent, Republican Cathleen Manchester, requested a recount, after which Manchester was declared the narrow winner. On December 3, Manchester was provisionally seated by the Senate. On December 9, a Senate committee inspection invalidated 21 "phantom ballots" that had been discovered on election night for Manchester. Manchester immediately resigned and Breen was certified the winner.

In 2015, Breen was named Legislator of the Year by the Maine chapter of the American Academy of Pediatrics.

Breen ran unopposed in the Democratic primary races in 2016, 2018 and 2020. In the 2016 general election, she defeated Republican Charles “Bart” Ladd 58%-42%. In 2018, she won over Republican Cathy Nichols 62%-38%, and in 2020 she defeated Republican Jennifer White 62%-38%.

Breen has served on the Legislature's Environment and Natural Resources Committee. and as the Senate chair of the  Appropriations and Financial Affairs Committee in the 129th and 130th legislatures. She has been a member of the bipartisan Land Conservation Task Force.

Personal life
Breen lives in Falmouth with her husband, Jay Geller. She has two adult children, Emma and Aaron.

Electoral history

Maine State Senate

External links
Senator Catherine Breen--Maine State Legislature
Cathy Breen official campaign page
Catherine Breen--Ballotpedia
Facebook: Cathy Breen for State Senate
Facebook: Senator Cathy Breen

References

1965 births
Living people
People from Falmouth, Maine
Maine city council members
Democratic Party Maine state senators
Women state legislators in Maine
Tufts University School of Arts and Sciences alumni
University of Illinois Chicago alumni
Women city councillors in Maine
21st-century American politicians
21st-century American women politicians